Oracle State Park is a state park of Arizona, US, preserving  in the northeastern foothills of the Santa Catalina Mountains. The park is named after the nearby town of Oracle. Oracle State Park serves as a wildlife refuge, and is open during the winter from 9am – 5pm, and during the summer from 8am - 4pm. In October 2011 Arizona State Parks agreed to reopen Oracle on a limited basis with a $40,000 budget if the park's Friends group can raise $21,000 in additional funds.

History
Starting in 1902, the area that is now the park was owned and operated as a cattle ranch by Neal Kannally and his family. At its largest, the ranch encompassed 50,000 acres, most of which was eventually sold off to mining companies. The remaining property was occupied until Neal's last remaining sibling, Lucile, bequeathed it to the Defenders of Wildlife organization in 1976, and ten years later, the land was donated to the state of Arizona to create a wildlife refuge.

In 2014, the International Dark-Sky Association designated Oracle State Park as a Dark Sky Park.

Flora and fauna

Plants
The most common plants in Oracle State Park are prickly pear and cholla cactus, scrub oak, mesquite, many wildflowers, and the occasional piñon and juniper. A solitary saguaro cactus is located in the park. The original ranch house, which was converted to be the park headquarters, has some cypress trees nearby.

Wildlife
Bird species include red-tailed hawks, golden eagles, prairie falcons, black-throated sparrows, Gambel's quail, cactus wrens, pyrrhuloxia, northern mockingbirds, northern flickers, common poorwills, northern cardinals, and great horned owls. Many mammals inhabit the park, such as ringtails, javalinas, cougars, rock squirrels, desert cottontails, black-tailed jackrabbits, mule deer, and white-tailed deer. Reptiles and amphibians found in the area include the western box turtles, Arizona alligator lizards, Colorado River toads, bull snakes, and western diamondback rattlesnakes.

Kannally Ranch House
The Kannally Ranch House is a historic house museum with original art and historic photos. The four-level adobe home was constructed between 1929 and 1933, features Mediterranean and Moorish architectural influences and is listed on the National Register of Historic Places. The ranch house is open for self guided tours during park hours.

Center for Environmental Education
The purpose of the park is to "protect the designated wildlife refuge and act as an environmental learning center."  Before closure the park offered natural history and environmental education programs for school and adult groups, including trail walks, workshops, presentations and special events.

References

External links
 Oracle State Park
 Friends of Oracle State Park
 An entry by the International Dark-Sky Association

1976 establishments in Arizona
Historic house museums in Arizona
Museums in Pinal County, Arizona
Parks in Pinal County, Arizona
Protected areas established in 1976
Santa Catalina Mountains
State parks of Arizona
Houses on the National Register of Historic Places in Arizona
National Register of Historic Places in Pinal County, Arizona